In the Battle of al-Sannabra (1113), a Crusader army led by King Baldwin I of Jerusalem was defeated by a Muslim army sent by the Sultan of the Seljuk Turks and commanded by Mawdud ibn Altuntash of Mosul.

Background
Beginning in 1110, the Seljuk Sultan Muhammad I in Baghdad ordered invasions of the Crusader states for six successive years. "In 1110, 1112, and 1114 the city of Edessa was the objective; in 1113 Galilee was invaded, and in 1111 and 1115 the Latin possessions which lay east of the Orontes between Aleppo and Shaizar." 

The attack on Edessa in 1110 failed to take the city. In 1111, Mawdud of Mosul led a host which fought Baldwin I's Frankish army to a draw in the Battle of Shaizar. Afterward, the Muslim leader's army dispersed because of its lack of success and plunder. In 1112 and 1114, the Muslim counterattack against Edessa was weak. In the other four years, the Crusader states - the Kingdom of Jerusalem, Principality of Antioch, County of Tripoli and County of Edessa - joined forces in defense.

Battle

In 1113, Mawdud joined Toghtekin of Damascus and their combined army aimed to cross the Jordan River south of the Sea of Galilee. Baldwin I offered battle near the bridge of al-Sannabra. Mawdud used the device of a feigned flight to entice Baldwin I into rashly ordering a charge. The Frankish army was surprised and beaten when it unexpectedly ran into the main Turkish army. 

The surviving Crusaders kept their cohesion and fell back to a hill west of the inland sea where they fortified their camp. In this position they were reinforced from Tripoli and Antioch but remained inert. A number of Christian pilgrims also rallied to the army after al-Sannabra. 

Unable to annihilate the Crusaders, Mawdud watched them with his main army while sending raiding columns to ravage the countryside and sack the town of Nablus. In this, Mawdud anticipated the strategy of Saladin in two later campaigns that were marked by the Battle of Belvoir Castle (1182) and the Battle of Al-Fule (1183). As in these campaigns, the Frankish field army could oppose the main Muslim army, but it could not stop raiding forces from doing great damage to crops and towns. 

While the Turkish raiders roamed freely through Crusader lands, the local Muslim farmers entered into friendly relations with them. This deeply troubled the Frankish land magnates, who ultimately depended upon rents from cultivators of the soil.

Aftermath

Mawdud was unable to make any permanent conquests after his victory. Soon afterward, he was assassinated and Aq-Sunqur Bursuqi took command of the failed attempt against Edessa in 1114. Roger of Salerno routed the last Seljuk invading army at the Battle of Sarmin after a protracted campaign in 1115.

References

 Smail, R. C. Crusading Warfare 1097-1193. New York: Barnes & Noble Books, (1956) 1995. 

Battles involving the Seljuk Empire
1110s in the Kingdom of  Jerusalem
Conflicts in 1113
1113 in Asia
Battles involving the Kingdom of Jerusalem